József Ursz (born 27 July 1982) is a Hungarian footballer who plays for Békéscsabai Előre FC as midfielder.

References

1982 births
Living people
People from Békéscsaba
Hungarian footballers
Association football defenders
Békéscsaba 1912 Előre footballers
Szolnoki MÁV FC footballers
Kecskeméti TE players
Sportspeople from Békés County
21st-century Hungarian people